The Trofeo Internazionale Bastianelli is a professional one day cycling race held annually in Italy. It is part of UCI Europe Tour in category 1.2.

Winners

References

Cycle races in Italy
UCI Europe Tour races
Recurring sporting events established in 1977
1977 establishments in Italy